Gasparyan is an Armenian surname.

Gasparyan, Gasparian, Gasparjan in Eastern Armenian, or Kasparian, Kasparyan or Kasbarian (in Western Armenian) are all Latin alphabet variants of the same name, the spelling of which depends on what kind of Romanization of Armenian has taken place.

It may refer to the following:

People

Gasparyan
 Djivan Gasparyan, an Armenian musician and composer
 Edgar Gasparyan, an Armenian footballer 
 Gohar Gasparyan, an Egypt-born Armenian opera singer
 Gohar Gasparyan (entertainer), an Armenian television announcer and journalist
 Margarita Gasparyan, a Russian tennis player

Gasparian
 Scott Gasparian, aka 1Sky, an American-born Artist/Inventor

Kasparian 

 Ana Kasparian, American political talk show host

Kasparyan
 Genrikh Kasparyan, chess grandmaster
 Yuri Kasparyan, guitarist

Kasbarian
 Michael Petros III Kasparian, 3rd Catholicos-Patriarch of the Armenian Catholic Church
 Hovhannes Bedros XVIII Kasparian, 18th Catholicos-Patriarch of the Armenian Catholic Church
 Anahit 'Ana' Kasparian, television producer and host
 Sarkis Kasparian, former president of ASA Issy French football club

Kasparov 
Kasparov is a Russified version of the same surname
 Garry Kasparov, former world chess champion
 Gevorg Kasparov, an Armenian goalkeeper

See also

 Comendador Levy Gasparian, a Brazilian municipality

Armenian-language surnames
Patronymic surnames
Surnames from given names